Gaztaf-e Olya (also Romanized as Gazţāf-e ‘Olyā; also known as Gazāb, Gaz Şāf-e ‘Olyā, and Gazţāf-e Bālā) is a village in Hendudur Rural District, Sarband District, Shazand County, Markazi Province, Iran. At the 2006 census, its population was 83, in 15 families.

References 

Populated places in Shazand County